Fana Mokoena (born 13 May 1971) is a South African Film, television and theater actor, and a political activist who served as a Member of Parliament, first as a delegate to the National Council of Provinces representing his home province Free State from May 2014 until August 2016; then later as a full member of the National Assembly of South Africa between August 2016 and October 2020. Mokoena is a member of the Economic Freedom Fighters party and serves on the party's central command team.

Early life and acting career
Fana Mokoena was born on 13 May 1971 in Kroonstad, Free State, South Africa. He was raised in Kroonstad and later schooled in Johannesburg by his mother and stepfather, along with his three siblings. His last three years of high school were spent at Woodmead School, which was the first fully multi-racial school in the country, where his love of the arts began. He studied Theatre and Performance at the University of Cape Town and later qualified in Media Studies. He started his acting career as a full member of the Playhouse Theatre company in 1993, and in 1994 he made his television debut in the South African TV film The Line. Mokoena played a small role in the thriller Dangerous Ground in 1997. In 2004, he portrayed the Rwandan general Augustin Bizimungu in the film Hotel Rwanda. In 2006, he played the role of Jaws Bengu in the South African series The LAB, a role which he played until 2009. In 2008, he appeared in a small role in the series Silent Witness. He played the role of Capt. James Sikobi in the South African drama A Small Town Called Descent in 2010. In 2011, he appeared in the action biography film adaptation of Machine Gun Preacher in the role of John Garang alongside Gerard Butler.

In 2012, he played a small role in the thriller Safe House with Denzel Washington. Mokoena appeared alongside Brad Pitt in the role of Thierry Umutoni in the zombie blockbuster World War Z in 2013. He also portrayed the anti-apartheid fighter Govan Mbeki in the film Mandela: Long Walk to Freedom with Idris Elba.

Accolades and awards

Mokoena has received several accolades in the entertainment industry, both in his home country and internationally, including Best Actor Award at the South African Film and Television Awards SAFTA for his role in The LAB; and Best Actor in Supporting Role at the African Movie Academy Awards AMAA in Lagos, Nigeria for his role in Man On Ground

Personal life

In 1976 Fana Mokoena's mother, Arcillia Mekodi Mokoena was detained and held in solitary confinement by the Apartheid regime for political activism She was incarcerated for inciting a student protest at a school in Kroonstad where she was a teacher, a protest action effected in solidarity with the 1976 Soweto Student uprising which saw scores of students being massacred by the Apartheid regime. This as violent protests broke out around the country against the oppressive use of Afrikaans as a medium of instruction, plus a host of other concerns. Mokoena*s mother was also physically and emotionally tortured, which.has left her scarred, but she is well and living in QwaQwa. Mokoena's mother is a political veteran in her own right and her son, Fana Mokoena took after her in political activism.

Mokoena is the eldest brother to the late Karabelo Israel Mokoena, Tlotlisang Dipallo Charity Xulu (née Mokoena) and Mamello Blessings Relebohile Mokoena.

Mokoena's stepfather Elias Bhuti Mokoena is late and so is his mother's eldest sister, Khasiane Alrina Ntloko whom he regarded as his mother too because she raised him while his real mother was incarcerated, and later had to study and work elsewhere. Mokoena fondly referred to Khasiane as "Mada".

Politics
Mokoena was initially a member of the African National Congress. He later left the party, because he believed it was corrupt. He then became a Founding Member of the Economic Freedom Fighters, where he now serves a member of the party's Central Command Team. Between 2014 and 2016, he was a member of the National Council of Provinces, the upper house of the Parliament of South Africa. In 2016, he was appointed as a member of the lower house of parliament, the National Assembly, as a member from Free State. Mokoena won a second term in the 2019 general election, with the Economic Freedom Fighters almost doubling their number of seats.

Mokoena resigned from the National Assembly with effect from 16 October 2020 but remained in the EFF's Central Command Team as a member of the War Council, the party's operational authority. He has returned to the Film and Television industry as a writer and producer. His company Praise Poet Pictures is working on several international productions. After 8 years hiatus from the entertainment industry due to his engagements in politics, Mokoena has returned to the small screen in a popular South African soapie Scandal! in a lead role as Vukile Kubheka which has thrust him back into the entertainment centre-stage.

Filmography
 52 Regent East (1993) as Lead
 The Line (1994) as Tebogo
 Inside (1996) as Prisoner (voice)
 Dangerous Ground (1997) as Youth
 Generations (1999) as Dr. Mandla Sithole
 Jump the Gun (1999) as Man in shacks
 In My Country (2004) as Mandla (uncredited)
 Hotel Rwanda (2004) as General Bizimungu
 Cuppen (2006) as Madoda
 The LAB (2006–2009, South African TV series) as Jaws Bengu
 Silent Witness (2008) as Katembula
 Wild at Heart (2008-2010, TV Series) as Mr Ekotto
 A Small Town Called Descent (2010) as Captain James Sikobi
 State of Violence (2010) as Bobedi
 Hopeville (2010) as Mogapi Khobane
 Machine Gun Preacher (2011) as John Garang
 Man on Ground (2011) as Timothi
 Inside Story (2011) as Goodwill
 Safe House (2012) as Officer in charge
 World War Z (2013) as Thierry Umutoni
 Mandela: Long Walk to Freedom (2013) as Govan Mbeki
 Cold Harbour (2013) as Specialist
 The Call (2015) as Sibongiseni
 The Book of Negroes (2015) as Allasane
 Scandal! (2021) as Vukile Kubheka

References

External links
 The stuff soaps are made of, Mail & Guardian, 31 May 2002
 
 TVSA Actor Profile
 

1971 births
Living people
People from Kroonstad
South African Sotho people
South African male film actors
South African male television actors
Best Supporting Actor Africa Movie Academy Award winners
Economic Freedom Fighters politicians
University of Cape Town alumni